Sonic Seasonings is a studio double album by American keyboardist and composer Wendy Carlos, in 1972 by Columbia Records. The album features four ambient music tracks, each loosely based on one of the four seasons, combining various field recordings with sounds from a Moog synthesizer. It marks a departure from her previous two albums which featured synthesized renditions of pieces of classical music. The album reached No. 168 on the US Billboard 200. In 1998, it was remastered for CD with two previously unreleased tracks.

Production 
Following the release of her second studio album The Well-Tempered Synthesizer in late 1969, the second featuring synthesized pieces of classical music, Carlos proceeded to change musical direction for her next album. Collaborating with friend and producer Rachel Elkind, the two sought to produce music that was "deliberately minimal" and had "a much longer span" than was typical of contemporary music at the time. The two decided on an album with four long tracks, each loosely based on each of the four seasons, partly constructed with improvised and composed passages. Various field recordings of nature are incorporated into the pieces, including wind on "Fall", bird song on "Spring", and insects on "Summer".

The album was recorded on a 3-M tape machine, which was restored with modern components in preparation for the album's 1998 remastering.

Release 

Upon its release in 1972, Sonic Seasonings reached No. 168 on the US Billboard 200. Initially, Carlos wished for Columbia Records to release the album in the Compatible Discrete 4 Quadrophonic sound system, but the label refused to do so.

Legacy 
Sonic Seasonings is widely regarded as the first new-age music album.  It was released six years before Brian Eno coined the term "ambient music" with his release, Ambient 1: Music for Airports (1978).

Track listing

1998 CD reissue 
East Side Digital reissued Sonic Seasonings in 1998 as a remastered two-CD set, containing the original album, one out-take track, and two previously unreleased compositions.

Personnel 
 Wendy Carlos – synthesizers, field recordings, design, mastering, engineering
 Rachel Elkind – vocalise on "Winter", original package design, liner notes
 Ed Lee – original package design
 Ogata Korin – cover art
 Jorma Puranen – tundra photograph
 Annemarie Franklin – executive producer

References 

1972 albums
Wendy Carlos albums
Columbia Records albums
Albums produced by Wendy Carlos